Bill Freund may refer to:
Bill Freund (cyclist) (born 1941), American Olympic cyclist
Bill Freund (historian) (1944–2020), American historian in South Africa